The 2017 Hockey East Men's Ice Hockey Tournament was played between March 3 and March 18, 2017 at campus locations and at the TD Garden in Boston, Massachusetts. The Massachusetts–Lowell River Hawks defeated the Boston College Eagles by a score of 4–3 to earn their 3rd Hockey East championship in school history, the third in five years, and earn Hockey East's automatic bid into the 2017 NCAA Division I Men's Ice Hockey Tournament. C. J. Smith was named tournament MVP.

The tournament was the 33rd in league history.

Format
The tournament included all twelve teams in the conference. Seeds 1–4 earned a first-round bye, and seeds 5–12 played a best-of-three Opening Round played on campus locations. Winners advanced to play the 1–4 seeds in the best-of-three Quarterfinals on campus locations. Winners of those series played in a single-game Semifinal, and those winners faced off in a single-game Championship Final, both at the TD Garden.

Regular season standings
Note: GP = Games played; W = Wins; L = Losses; T = Ties; PTS = Points; GF = Goals For; GA = Goals Against

Bracket
Teams are reseeded after the Opening Round and Quarterfinals

Note: * denotes overtime period(s)

Results

Opening Round

(5) Providence vs. (12) Massachusetts

(6) Vermont vs. (11) Maine

(7) Merrimack vs. (10) New Hampshire

(8) Northeastern vs. (9) Connecticut

Quarterfinals

(1) Massachusetts–Lowell vs. (10) New Hampshire

(2) Boston University vs. (8) Northeastern

(3) Boston College vs. (6) Vermont

(4) Notre Dame vs. (5) Providence

Semifinals

(1) Massachusetts–Lowell vs. (4) Notre Dame

(2) Boston University vs. (3) Boston College

Championship

(1) Massachusetts–Lowell vs. (3) Boston College

Tournament awards

All-Tournament Team
F Joe Gambardella Massachusetts–Lowell
F C. J. Smith* Massachusetts–Lowell
F Ryan Fitzgerald Boston College
D Michael Kapla Massachusetts–Lowell
D Scott Savage Boston College
G Tyler Wall Massachusetts–Lowell

* Tournament MVP(s)

References

External links
2017 Hockey East Men's Ice Hockey Tournament

Hockey East Men's Ice Hockey Tournament
Hockey East Men's Ice Hockey Tournament
Hockey East Men's Ice Hockey Tournament